Dyspessa elbursensis is a species of moth of the family Cossidae. It is found in Iran.

Subspecies
Dyspessa elbursensis elbursensis (northern Iran)
Dyspessa elbursensis derbenti Daniel, 1964 (Iran)

References

Moths described in 1964
Dyspessa
Moths of Asia